In modern fencing, the piste or strip is the playing area. Regulations require the piste to be 14 metres long and between 1.5 and 2 metres wide. The last two metres on each end are hash-marked to warn a fencer before they back off the end of the strip, after which is a 1.5 to 2 metre runoff.  The piste is also marked at the centre and at the "en garde" lines, located two metres either side of the center line.

Retreating off the end of the strip with both feet results in a touch awarded for the opponent. Going off the side of the strip with one or both feet halts the fencing action, and is penalized by allowing the opponent to advance one metre before being replaced on guard. If the offending fencer would then be replaced behind the rear limit of the strip because of this, a touch is awarded to the opponent. If play is halted for any reason other than stepping off the side of the piste a fencer may never be replaced on guard behind the rear line.

After each touch, fencers begin again at the en garde line, 4 metres apart, or if these lines are not available, roughly at a position where their blades can nearly touch when fully extended. If no touch is scored but play was halted, the fencers come en garde at the position they were stopped.

Most pistes at fencing tournaments are "grounded" to the scoring box, thus any hits that a fencer makes against the piste will not be registered as a touch. This is to prevent accidental touches to the piste from registering as off target and resulting in a halt.

Types of piste 
There are three different types of piste:

 Rubber conductive piste
Made from conductive material with a rubber back; lightweight, approximately 25 kg.

 Aluminium section piste
Made from sections of rolled aluminum which are bolted together; weighs approximately 300 kg

 Metallic piste
Made from woven metal with no backing; weighs approximately 70 kg

References

External links
International Rules (French language version)
International Rules (English language Version)
US Fencing Rules

Fencing